The BP Portrait Award is an annual portraiture competition held at the National Portrait Gallery in London, England. It is the successor to the John Player Portrait Award. It is the most important portrait prize in the world, and is reputedly one of the most prestigious competitions in contemporary art.

History
British Petroleum took over sponsorship of the competition in 1989 from John Player & Sons, a tobacco company which had sponsored it from its inception in 1980, and has sponsored it since. The presence of both sponsors has triggered protests, with the group Art Not Oil (part of the international Rising Tide network) being responsible for most of those against BP.  In 2016, The Museums Association conducted a formal investigation into BP's sponsorship when Art Not Oil alleged that the company influenced curatorial decisions and used its association with the National Gallery to further its political interests both domestic and international.

The exhibition opens in June each year and runs until September. First prize is typically £30,000. In the early years of the century, the prize went up from £5,000, and its catchment area was gradually extended from residents of the UK and is now unrestricted. Until 2006, the competition has been open to under-40s only. Since 2007, it is open to anyone over the age of 18 and a separate BP Young Artist Award is granted to the best portrait artist between 18 and 30.

In 1993, Tom Hallifax was used to advertise the awards.

In 2012 the competition received 2,187 entries from 74 countries (including 1,500 from the UK) of which 55 paintings were selected to be exhibited.

Winners

John Player Portrait Award
1980
1981
1982 – Humphrey Ocean
1983 – Michael R. Taylor
1984 – Rosemary Beaton
1985 – Jeff Stultiens
1986 – Ivy Smith
1987 – Alison Watt
1988 – Allan Ramsay
1989 – Paula MacArthur & Tai-Shan Schierenberg – joint first prize winners

BP Portrait Award
1990 – Annabel Cullen  
1991 – Justin Mortimer  
1992 – Lucy Willis
1993 – Philip Harris 
1994 – Peter Edwards 
1995 – Ishbel Myerscough 
1996 – James Hague
1997 – James Lloyd 
1998 – Thomas Watson 
1999 – Clive Smith 
2000 – Victoria Russell  
2001 – Stuart Pearson Wright 
2002 – Catherine Goodman
2003 – Charlotte Harris
2004 – Stephen Shankland 
2005 – Dean Marsh 
2006 – Andrew Tift 
2007 – Paul Emsley 
2008 – Craig Wylie and Praneet Arora
2009 – Peter Monkman
2010 – Daphne Todd
2011 – Wim Heldens
2012 – Aleah Chapin
2013 – Susanne du Toit
2014 – Thomas Ganter
2015 – Matan Ben-Cnaan
2016 – Clara Drummond
2017 – Benjamin Sullivan
2018 – Miriam Escofet
2019 – Charlie Schaffer
2020– Jiab Prachakul

SELF Portrait Prize 
 2013 Jan Mikulka

Selected works

It has become a BP Portrait Awards convention that a single work is selected to be used prominently on that year's posters and other publicity materials, and for the cover of the year's exhibition catalogue. Recent "showcase" portraits include:

2004 – "Caroline" by James E Crowther
2005 – "Portrait of Chantal Menard" by Sean Cheetham
2006 – "Matthew" by Ben Jamie
2007 – "Winter Portrait" by Ingolv Helland 
2008 – "Konjit" by Maryam Foroozanfar 
2009 – "Georgie" by Mary Jane Ansell / "On Assi Ghat" by Edward Sutcliffe (used by National Gallery Scotland)
2010 – "Blue Coco" by Shaun Downey
2011 – "Geneva" by Ilaria Rosselli del Turco
2012 – "Rosie and Pumpkin" by Vanessa Lubach / "Richie Culver" by Alan Coulson
2013 – "Inner Dialogue" by Jamie Routley
2014 – "Engels" by Patrik Graham / "Gina and Cristiano" by Isabella Watling (used by National Gallery Scotland)
2015 – "Portrait of Esta Sexton, aged 12" by Paul P Smith
2016 – "Francesca" by Daniele Vezzani / "Tad (Son Of The Artist)" by John Borowicz (used by National Gallery Scotland)
2017 – "Lemn Sissay" by Fiona Graham-Mackay
2018 – "Laura" by Shawn McGovern
2019 – "Manresa" by Frances Borden

BP Visitor Choice
Each year, the BP Visitor Choice competition offers visitors to the highly popular BP Portrait Award exhibition the opportunity to vote for their favourite portrait in the exhibition.

2006 – Vanessa Garwood
2007 – Hynek Martinec
2008 – José Luis Corella
2009 – José Luis Corella
2010 – Michal Ožibko
2011 – Jan Mikulka
2012 – Colin Davidson
2013 – Lionel Smit
2014 – Yunsung Jang
2015 – José Luis Corella
2016 – Jean-Paul Tibbles
2017 – Rupert Alexander

BP Travel Award
The BP Travel Award is an annual award allowing artists to experience working in a different environment on a project related to portraiture. The successful applicants work is exhibited at the Portrait Gallery the following year. Country of each artists project shown in brackets below.

1998 – Stuart Pearson Wright (UK)
2000 – Si Sapsford (Iceland)
2001 – Alan Parker (UK)
2002 – Daisy Richardson & Jessica Wolfson (Russia/China)
2003 – Ulyana Gumeniuk (Russia)
2004 – Darvish Fakhr (Iran)
2005 – Joel Ely (Spain)
2006 – Toby Wiggins (UK)
2007 – Gareth Reid (Finland)
2008 – Emmanouil Bitsakis (China)
2009 – Isobel Peachey (Belgium/Switzerland)
2010 – Paul Beel (Greece)
2011 – Jo Fraser (Peru)
2012 – Carl Randall (Japan)
2013 – Sophie Ploeg (Belgium/UK)
2014 – Edward Sutcliffe (US)
2015 – Magali Cazo (West Africa)
2016 – Laura Guoke (Greece)

See also

 List of European art awards

References

External links
"Painting of artist's mother aged 100 wins BP Portrait Award" (telegraph.co.uk 23 June 2010) 
"BP Portrait Award 2010: Full frontal at the National Portrait Gallery" (guardian.co.uk, 23 June 2010)
"Three finalists compete for BP Portrait award prize after record entry" (guardian.co.uk 21 April 2009)
Search guardian.co.uk, 'National Portrait Award' (more than fifty articles, as of August 2010)
thesundaytimes.co.uk, 'National Portrait Award' (more than eighty articles, as of August 2010)
Art Not Oil

British art awards
Culture in London
National Portrait Gallery, London
 
Awards established in 1980
1980 establishments in the United Kingdom